The era of steamboats on the Arrow Lakes and adjoining reaches of the Columbia River is long-gone but was an important part of the history of the West Kootenay and Columbia Country regions of British Columbia Canada. The Arrow Lakes are formed by the Columbia River in southeastern British Columbia. Steamboats were employed on both sides of the border in the upper reaches of the Columbia, linking port towns on either side of the border, and sometimes boats would be built in one country and operated in the other. Tributaries of the Columbia include the Kootenay River which rises in Canada, then flows south into the United States, then bends north again back into Canada, where it widens into Kootenay Lake.  As with the Arrow Lakes, steamboats once operated on the Kootenay River and Kootenay Lake.

Route

The Arrow Lakes route was accessible from the north, by a rail connection with the Canadian Pacific Railway (CPR) at Revelstoke, where the CPR crosses the Columbia River. The Arrow Lakes Route was also accessible from the south, at Northport, Washington, also on the Columbia River, where there was also a rail connection. The Columbia River crossed the border near Boundary, Washington, about 749 miles from the mouth of the Columbia, if traced along the river's route. Revelstoke was 937 miles from the mouth of the Columbia, so the total distance of the Arrow Lakes route was 182 miles from Revelstoke to Boundary.

Towns along the route, from south to north were Fort Colvile and Northport in Washington, and Trail in British Columbia. After Trail, the Columbia widened into Lower Arrow Lake. Towns and landings along Lower Arrow Lake were Robson, Edgewood, Needles, Fauquier, Burton and Graham Landing. North of Grand Landing, the lake narrowed and became more like a river. After this stretch, it widened into Upper Arrow Lake. Towns and landings along Upper Arrow Lake included Nakusp, Arrowhead and on a short northeasterly branch of the lake, Comaplix and Beaton. North of Arrowhead, the lake narrowed and became the Columbia River again, up to the next major town, which was Revelstoke.

Initial steamboats placed on the route

The first steamboat on the route was the Forty-Nine, built to service a brief gold rush on the Big Bend of the Columbia River, attempting the run from Marcus, Washington Territory, just above Kettle Falls, to La Porte, one of the main boomtowns of the rush, which was sited at the foot of the infamous and also impassable Dalles des Morts or Death Rapids, which were at the head of river navigation but also just below the richest of the Big Bend's goldfields, on the Goldstream River which meets the Columbia just upstream. Another major goldfield, Downie Creek, joined the Columbia just below the rapids and was the site of the boomtown, another port of call on the run. When the gold rush ended, Forty-Nine was withdrawn for lack of clientele, and the captain gave free passage out of the Big Bend area for those who could not afford passage.  After that, the small steam launch Alpha ran supplies up to Revelstoke (then called Farwell) where the CPR was building a crossing over the Columbia River for its transcontinental line. In 1885, a much larger vessel, the sternwheeler Kootenai, was built at Little Dalles at Northport, for the CPR, but grounded in September of that year, and was laid up for a number of years afterwards. After that, three businessmen formed the Columbia Transportation Company and put SS Dispatch on the Arrow Lakes route. The Dispatch (sometimes spelled "Despatch") was a clunky-looking catamaran, which first ran on August 9, 1888. Her owners made enough money from her operations to buy the Marion, which had been operating above the Big Bend. She was shipped over and launched at Revelstoke.

The owners of the Columbia Transportation Company brought in some bigger businessmen, J.A. Mara, Frank S. Barnard and Captain John Irving, who formed the Columbia River and Kootenay Steam Navigation Company on January 21, 1890, with a capital of $100,000. In 1889 and 1890, the new firm purchased the idle Kootenai for $10,000 and built and launched the Lytton at Revelstoke, which was ready for service in July 1890. The first trip taken by the Lytton on July 2, 1890, was transporting rails and other track-building supplies south through the Arrow Lakes to Sproat's Landing, where the Kootenay River flowed into the Columbia, for a railroad that the CPR was building from the landing to Nelson on Kootenay Lake. The trip was 150 miles each way, and Lytton averaged 12 miles an hour downstream and 11 miles an hour upstream, including stops for wooding up and minor repairs.

By August 1890, American interests had completed a railroad, called the Spokane Falls and Northern, from Spokane Falls (later simply Spokane) to Little Dalles, Washington (Northport). Lytton, Kootenai and the Arrow Lakes route formed a link between the northern CPR railhead at Revelstoke the Arrow Lake to the southern railhead at Little Dalles.

Expansion of the fleet

After the successful 1890 season, the Columbia & Kootenay Steam Navigation Company decided to expand the fleet by adding a new sternwheeler, Columbia, built at Little Dalles, and launched in 1891, at price of $75,000. She remained under American registry. Once Columbia was in service, C&KSN was able to run two roundtrip boats weekly from Revelstoke to Little Dalles. The critical nature of the Arrow Lakes steamboat route can be judged by the fact that when the steamboats were not running, mail from Revelstoke to Nelson, on Kootenay Lake, took 10 to 14 days, as opposed to the two days during the summer steamboat season.

C&KSN also brought up from Oregon one of the best steamboat captains on the Columbia River, James W. Troup, to manage its operations on Arrow and Kootenay lakes. Troup had to deal with a number of challenges, including irregular schedules, and ice and low water blocking operations. At one point, the water level, apparently in the narrows between upper and lower Arrow Lakes, was so low that only the small Dispatch and Marion could make the run between the lakes. Troup built SS Illecillewaet at Revelstoke, launched October 30, 1892, and "designed to float on dew". She was small, and apparently ugly, but was a big improvement over Dispatch, and could operate in low water when no other boat could.

In 1893, a rail extension was built from Arrowhead to a junction with the CPR mainline at Revelstoke. Boats no longer needed to steam up the shallow waters of the Columbia between the north end of Upper Arrow Lake and Revelstoke, and Arrowhead now became the effective northern head of navigation.

Lytton was driven ashore by a storm on July 26, 1896, near Nakusp, and had to be withdrawn from service for emergency repair work there. On August 2, 1894, Columbia was destroyed by fire just north of the international border. This took out both of the C&KSN's passenger steamers, leaving only Illecillewaet and Kootenai moving the freight business, which was mostly related to rail construction. Troup needed a replacement for Columbia right way, so he brought in the Bulger family, experienced steamboat builders from Portland, Oregon, to run the shipyards at Nakusp and at Nelson, and to build Columbia'''s replacement.

On July 1, 1895, the new sternwheeler, Nakusp, was launched from the shipyard at the city of the same name. This vessel was the largest yet seen on the Arrow Lakes, 1,034 tons, almost twice the tonnage of Columbia. She was luxurious in a way other vessels never had been.

List of vessels
The following steamboats and related vessels operated on these lakes:

See also
Moyie (sternwheeler)
List of ships in British Columbia
Steamboats of the upper Columbia and Kootenay Rivers

Notes

The Columbia was bought by the Waldie lumber Co. and refitted from steam to a Vivian Diesel in 1948

Further reading
Downs, Art, Paddlewheels on the Frontier, (1st Ed.), Superior Publishing, Seattle, WA 1972
Mills, Randall V., Sternwheelers up Columbia, University of Nebraska, Lincoln 1947 
Timmen, Fritz, Blow for the Landing, Caxton Printers, Caldwell, ID 1973 
Turner, Robert D., Sternwheelers and Steam Tugs'', Sono Nis Press, Victoria, BC 1984

External links

Arrow Lakes Historical Society

Trail Historical Society
Crowsnest Pass Railway Route (Canadian Museum of Rail Travel)
Revelstoke Museum and Archives
"Trails In Time" website page on "Steamboats on the Columbia River"
NFB film that includes the last run of the Minto

 
 Arrow Lakes
Columbia River
Arrow Lakes
Arrow Lakes